Renaldi (born 5 July 2003) is an Indonesian professional footballer who plays as a defender for Liga 2 club Gresik United, on loan from Liga 1 club PSM Makassar.

Club career

PSM Makassar
He started playing professionally with Liga 1 club PSM Makassar in 2021. Renaldi made his league debut on 19 February 2022 in a match against Persita Tangerang at the Ngurah Rai Stadium, Denpasar.

Career statistics

Club

Notes

References

External links
 Renaldi at Soccerway
 Renaldi at Liga Indonesia

2003 births
Living people
People from Makassar
Sportspeople from South Sulawesi
Sportspeople from Makassar
Indonesian footballers
Liga 1 (Indonesia) players
Liga 2 (Indonesia) players
PSM Makassar players
Muba Babel United F.C. players
Gresik United players
Association football defenders